Brandon Mechele (born 28 January 1993) is a Belgian footballer who plays as a centre back for Belgian Pro League side Club Brugge and the Belgium national team.

International career
Mechele earned his first full international call up when Roberto Martinez named him in the Belgium squad in October 2018. He made his Belgium national football team debut on 13 October 2019 in a Euro 2020 qualifier against Kazakhstan. He substituted Thomas Vermaelen in added time.

Career statistics

Club

International

Honours
Club Brugge
 Belgian Pro League: 2015–16, 2017–18, 2019–20, 2020–21, 2021–22
 Belgian Cup: 2014–15
 Belgian Super Cup: 2021, 2022

References

External links

1993 births
Living people
Belgian footballers
Belgium under-21 international footballers
Belgium international footballers
Belgian Pro League players
Club Brugge KV players
People from Bredene
Association football central defenders
Footballers from West Flanders